Akash Vashist (born 17 December 1994) is an Indian cricketer. He made his first-class debut on 17 December 2019, for Himachal Pradesh in the 2019–20 Ranji Trophy.

References

External links
 

1994 births
Living people
Indian cricketers
Himachal Pradesh cricketers
Place of birth missing (living people)